The 2015–16 season was Livingston's fifth consecutive season in the second tier of Scottish football and their third season in the Scottish Championship. Livingston also competed in the Challenge Cup, League Cup and the Scottish Cup. Livingston finished the season in ninth place and were relegated to the third-tier of Scottish football for the first time since 2011.

Summary

Management
Livingston began the 2015–16 season under the management of Mark Burchill who had guided the club to safety from relegation on the final day of the previous season. On the 21 December 2015, Burchill was sacked from his position as manager and was replaced by David Hopkin who was given the role until the end of the season, however he couldn't avoid the club being relegated to League One after a 6–8 aggregate loss to Stranraer in the championship play-offs.

Results & fixtures

Pre Season

Scottish Championship

Championship play-off

Scottish Challenge Cup

Scottish League Cup

Scottish Cup

Player statistics

Squad 

|-
|colspan="12"|Players who left the club during the 2015–16 season
|-

|}

Team statistics

League table

Division summary

Transfers

Players in

Players out

See also
List of Livingston F.C. seasons

References

Livingston
2015andndash;16